Ming's Bight is a town in the Canadian province of Newfoundland and Labrador. The town had a population of 298 in 2021 Census, down from 319 in the Canada 2016 Census.

Demographics 

See also
 Baie Verte, Newfoundland and Labrador
 List of cities and towns in Newfoundland and Labrador

References 

Towns in Newfoundland and Labrador